Gbarnga is the capital city of Bong County, Liberia, lying north east of Monrovia.   During the First Liberian Civil War, it was the base for Charles Taylor's National Patriotic Front of Liberia.  Cuttington College, a private, Episcopal-affiliated institution, is located near the town. Its campus was once home to the Africana Museum, which was destroyed during the civil war.

As of the 2008 census, Gbarnga has a population of 34,046. Of this, 16,080 were male and 17,966 female; it is the fourth-most populous urban area in Liberia.

Gbarnga is the hometown of Tamba Hali, a professional football player of the Kansas City Chiefs of the National Football League in the United States.

The town is twinned with Baltimore, Maryland, in the United States.

Climate
Köppen-Geiger climate classification system classifies its climate as tropical monsoon (Am). Its climate is similar to the capital Monrovia, but less rainy and with cooler night temperatures.

Places of worship 

 Holy Spirit Cathedral

Education 
 Gboveh High School
 St. Martin's Catholic High School
Williams VS Tubman-Gray united methodist High School
AB Francis SDA School
St. Peter Episcopal High School
Alexandre A. Andrews Academy High School

References

 
Bong County
County capitals in Liberia